Kavach ... Kaali Shaktiyon Se (Season 1)/ Kavach ... Mahashivrati (Season 2) (English: Shield ) is a supernatural horror drama television series that airs on Colors TV. Produced by Balaji Telefilms, it is based on the story of Savitri and Satyavan.

The first season titled Kavach... Kali Shaktiyon Se premiered on 11 June 2016 and starred Mona Singh, Vivek Dahiya and Sara Khan as Paridhi, Rajbeer and Manjulika. The first season ended on 20 November 2016, completing 47 episodes.

The second season titled Kavach... Maha Shivratri premiered on 25 May 2019, starring Deepika Singh Goyal, Namik Paul and Vin Rana as Sandhya, Angad and Kapil. The second season ended abruptly on 27 October 2019. It had only 42 episodes.

Series overview

Plot

Season 2
The second season portrays the mystery of Lord Shiva's temple in Devlali beside a cremation ground where if an unmarried woman worships Lord Shiva on Mahashivratri night she can see her future husband's face. Evil spirits wander fearlessly at this time.

Sandhya, an unmarried beautiful girl ends up at this temple and worships Lord Shiva who shows her the face of a man. Sandhya, however, is engaged to be married to Angad whom she suspects is seeing someone else. She meets the mystery man as Angad's best friend, Kapil. A number of mishaps befall Sandhya but she is saved by Kapil each time. She decides to still marry Angad but on the wedding day, Sandhya ends up marrying Kapil first, when it is revealed that Kapil is an evil entity who had been plotting revenge for two years. Later, she realizes the truth about Kapil and her love for Angad and marries him, thus breaking her marriage with Kapil. However, Angad is soon possessed by Kapil who murders Ashutosh. Kapil also wants to impregnate Sandhya so that she bears his child in her womb. With help from Lord Shiva, a possessed Angad is able to reveal the truth to Sandhya who decides to protect Angad from Kapil by tying a rudraksha around his neck.

Sandhya discovers Kapil's past, he was a just man living with his wife Sakshi and son, Shakshi is later revealed to be Sandhya's abandoned twin sister, and Usha and Vinayak's lost daughter. After Kapil and his family were murdered by Ashutosh, Manoj. Bhairavi and Jolly, he and Sakshi turned into vengeful spirits seeking revenge on the perpetrators of their family life. Sandhya tries to convince Kapil and Sakshi to stop the killings and then Kapil's spirit is forced unwilling to leave Earth with the help of Shivji's priests. However, before leaving Kapil had succeeded in his physical relationship with Sandhya. Thus she becomes pregnant with Kapil's child. She decides to keep the baby with support from Angad and their families. Soon, Sandhya gives birth to a baby boy named Prem. However, Sakshi's spirit blames Sandhya for her abandonment and kidnaps Prem.

7 years later
After a while, Angad and Sandhya have a daughter, Aastha. On the other hand, Sandhya misses Prem and is desperately searching for him. Prem is shown to be living in Kapil's house like an animal, completely untouched by human interaction. Soon Sandhya finds Prem and brings him home, but he is not well accepted by all the Jindals due to his wild behavior. A rift develops between Sandhya and Angad due to Prem, as Angad starts feeling that Sandhya favors Prem who is her and Kapil's son over their own daughter, Aastha. Sakshi returns and becomes jealous on seeing Prem's growing attachment towards Sandhya. She soon takes control over Sandhya's body with the help of tantriks. However, with the help of a psychic named Rekha, Sandhya is able to find the truth behind Sakshi's death and convinces Angad to help her. Sandhya tells Sakshi that she will sacrifice herself and her life and leave everything to Sakshi. Sakshi is moved by Sandhya's kind act and finally decides to leave giving Prem safety to Sandhya.

After Sakshi's departure, Prem is constantly haunted by an evil entity named Bhao. Since Prem is a child born through the union of a human, Sandhya and Kapil, a spirit, he is supposed to possess special powers. But this was not know to anyone except a tantrik, Bhao who wanted to become immortal by capturing his body. So, he sends his spirits to force Sandhya to give his son. But with the help of Rekha, Sandhya and Angad defeat every spirit sent by Bhao. Bhao who was afraid that Prem shouldn't know about his power, learns that Prem uses his powers and saves his family. Finally, Sandhya learns about Bhao and how finish him. Meanwhile, Bhao sends Rasika, a spirit who makes her whole family into ghungroo and blackmails Sandhya to give up Prem. She finally gives Prem to Bhao. She manages to get back her family. Meanwhile, Bhao captures Prem's body and goes to kill Angad and Rekha. But Prem resists him and his rituals becomes incomplete. Finally, he goes to Sandhya replacing Prem to stop her in her plan to finish Bhao. But Prem tries to make Sandhya aware of Bhao so that they could finish Bhao. Thus, Sandhya being a mother now becomes a kavach (shield) for Prem protecting him from Bhao.

Cast

Season 1

Main
Mona Singh as Paridhi "Pari" Bundela– Bhavya's daughter; Minty's friend; Rajbeer's wife
Vivek Dahiya as Rajbeer Bundela– Jagat and Janki's son; Vikrant and Shreya's brother; Shakti's foster brother; Manjulika's former lover; Paridhi's husband
Mahek Chahal / Sara Khan as Manjulika Shah– Saudamini's daughter; Shakti's sister; Rajbeer's former lover; Tipsy's aunt
Ashwini Kalsekar as Saudamini Shah– Manjulika and Shakti's mother

Recurring
Rajeeta Kochhar as Kammo Singh Bundela, Rajbeer's grandmother
Deepali Kamath as Dhaarini Bundela– Bharat's wife; Rajbeer, Vikrant and Shreya's aunt; Shakti's foster aunt
Shiva Randani as Bharat Bundela– Jagat's brother; Dhaarini's husband; Rajbeer, Vikrant and Shreya's uncle; Shakti's foster uncle
Preeti Gupta/Resha Konkar as Natasha Shah– Shakti's wife; Tipsy's mother
Arun Singh Rana as Vikrant Bundela– Jagat and Janki's son; Rajbeer and Shreya's brother
Anurag Sharma as Shakti Shah– Saudamini's son; Manjulika's brother; Jagat and Janki's foster son; Rajbeer, Vikrant and Shreya's foster brother; Natasha's husband; Tipsy's father
An unknown child actress as Tipsi Shah– Shakti and Natasha's daughter
Astha Agarwal as Minty Singhal– Paridhi's friend
Neena Cheema as Damyanti– Paridhi's grandmother
Avdeep Sidhu as Vishal Mehra– Yamini's son; Shreya's former fiancé
An unknown actress as Shreya Bajpayee– Jagat and Janki's daughter; Rajbeer and Vikrant's sister; Shakti's foster sister; Kabir's wife
Parveen Kaur as Yamini Mehra– Vishal's mother
Leena Jumani as Niti
Garima Jain as Nisha Angre– Rajbeer's former fiancée
Arjun Bijlani as Arhaan– Jinn; Paridhi's helper
Jyoti Gauba as Bhavya– Fairy; Paridhi's mother
Malhar Pandya as Dr. Akaash Mehra– Psychiatrist
Pavitra Punia as Ritu Bajpayee– Kabir's sister; Rajbeer's former fiancée
Mehul Vyas as Kabir Bajpayee– Ritu's brother; Shreya's husband
Mohit Abrol as Jolly
Ritu Vijj as Janki Bundela– Jagat's wife; Rajbeer, Vikrant and Shreya's mother; Shakti's foster mother
An unknown actor as Jagat Bundela– Bharat's brother; Janki's husband; Rajbeer, Vikrant and Shreya's father; Shakti's foster father

Season 2

Main
 Deepika Singh Goyal in double role as
 Sandhya Jindal– (nee  Patvaradhan)Vinayak and Usha's daughter; Sakshi, Mowgli and Suman's sister; Kapil's former wife; Angad's wife; Prem and Aastha's mother
 Sakshi Salgaonkar– Vinayak and Usha's daughter; Sandhya, Mowgli and Suman's sister; Kapil's wife
 Namik Paul as Angad Jindal– Balraj and Malini's son; Shobha and Sanjana's brother; Roohi and Dev's cousin; Sandhya's husband; Aastha's father
 Zoya Viaan Shah as Prem Salgaonkar– Kapil and Sandhya's son
Vin Rana as Kapil Salgaonkar– Sakshi's husband; Sandhya's former husband; Prem's father
 Alina Pagaria as Aastha Jindal– Angad and Sandhya's daughter
 Mallika Nayak as Malini Jindal– Balraj's wife; Angad, Shobha and Sanjana's mother
 Manuj Bhaskar as Balraj Jindal– Jolly's brother; Malini's husband; Angad, Shobha and Sanjana's father; Roohi and Dev's uncle 
 Pranitaa Pandit as Rekha– Psychic

Recurring
 Antara Banerjee as Sanjana Jindal– Balraj and Malini's daughter; Angad and Shobha's sister
 Harsh Vashisht as Jolly Jindal– Balraj's brother; Kiran's husband; Roohi and Dev's father; Angad, Shobha and Sanjana's uncle
 Bhavana Roy as Kiran Jindal– Jolly's wife; Roohi and Dev's mother; Angad, Shobha and Sanjana's aunt
 Rushal Parakh as Dev Jindal– Jolly and Kiran's son; Roohi's brother; Angad, Shobha and Sanjana's cousin
 Sabina Jat as Roohi Jindal– Jolly and Kiran's daughter; Dev's sister; Angad, Shobha and Sanjana's cousin
 Susheel Bonthiyaal as Vinayak Patwardhan– Veerendra and Madhuri's son; Mankesh and Manju's brother; Usha's husband; Sandhya, Sakshi, Mowgli and Suman's father; Ankit, Kartik and Akhil's uncle
 Deepali Kamath as Usha Patwardhan– Vinayak's wife; Sandhya, Sakshi, Mowgli and Suman's mother; Ankit, Kartik and Akhil's aunt
 Smita Oak as Madhuri Patwardhan– Veerendra's wife; Vinayak, Mankesh and Manju's mother; Sandhya, Sakshi, Mowgli, Suman, Ankit, Kartik and Akhil's grandmother
Sushil Parashar as Veerendra Patwardhan– Madhuri's husband; Vinayak, Mankesh and Manju's father; Sandhya, Sakshi, Mowgli, Suman, Ankit, Kartik and Akhil's grandfather
 Nidhi Shah as Suman Patwardhan– Vinayak and Usha's daughter; Sandhya, Sakshi and Mowgli's sister
 Lavannya Bharadwaj as Mowgli Patwardan– Vinayak and Usha's son; Sandhya, Sakshi and Suman's brother
 Mandeep Kumar as Mankesh Patwardhan– Veerendra and Madhuri's son; Vinayak and Manju's brother; Pratibha's husband; Ankit, Kartik and Akhil's father; Sandhya, Sakshi, Mowgli and Suman's uncle
 as Pratibha Patwardhan– Mankesh's wife; Ankit, Kartik and Akhil's mother; Sandhya, Sakshi, Mowgli and Suman's aunt
 Luckbir Arora as Ankit Patwardhan– Mankesh and Pratibha's son; Kartik and Akhil's brother; Sandhya, Sakshi, Mowgli and Suman's cousin; Shobha's husband
 Sanyogita Mayer as Shobha Patwardhan– Balraj and Malini's daughter; Angad and Sanjana's sister; Roohi and Dev's cousin; Rishi's former wife; Ankit's wife
 Suraj Kakkar as Police Officer Kartik Patwardhan– Mankesh and Pratibha's son; Ankit and Akhil's brother; Sandhya, Sakshi, Mowgli and Suman's cousin
 Kabeer Kumar as Akhil Patwardhan– Mankesh and Pratibha's son; Ankit and Kartik's brother; Sandhya, Sakshi, Mowgli and Suman's cousin
 Hritu Dudani as Nisha
Vijay Badlani IAS Rishi Mitter– Shobha's former husband
 Shirin Sewani as Archana– Sandhya's friend
 Afzaal Khan as Manoj– Jolly's friend
 Rishika Nag as Ranjana– Sandhya's friend
Ahmad Harhash as Raj Singh Sandhya,s friend 
 Yogita Bihani as Manju Patwardhan– Veerendra and Madhuri's daughter; Vinayak and Mankesh's sister; Sandhya, Sakshi, Mowgli, Suman, Ankit, Kartik and Akhil's aunt
 as Manoj's wife

References

Balaji Telefilms television series
2016 Indian television series debuts
Indian fantasy television series
Indian drama television series
Colors TV original programming
Hindi-language television shows
Indian supernatural television series

id:Kavach